Nickson Kolo is a Papua New Guinean professional rugby league footballer, a blockbusting forward who plays for the newly formed club Gulf Isapeas in the Digicel Cup in Papua New Guinea, He is a former Papua New Guinea international.

He has represented Papua New Guinea in the Prime Minister's XIII games between Australia and PNG between 2007 and 2010.
His trade mark, blockbusting runs had earned him a place in the Papua New Guinea training squad for the 2008 Rugby League World Cup.

He played for PNG  in the 2008 Rugby League World Cup.

He has also played for Papua New Guinea in the 2010 Four Nations tournament in New Zealand and Australia.

References

1985 births
Living people
Hagen Eagles players
Masta Mark Rangers players
Papua New Guinea national rugby league team players
Papua New Guinean rugby league players
Rugby league locks
Rugby league props
Rugby league second-rows